Admiral Nirmal Kumar Verma (born 14 November 1950) is a former senior naval officer who served as the Chief of the Naval Staff of Indian Navy, from 31 August 2009 to 31 August 2012. In November 2012, he was appointed as the High Commissioner to Canada.

Early life
Born on 14 November 1950, he joined the Indian Navy at the age of 19. He studied at Goethals Memorial School Kurseong, Royal Naval Staff College in the United Kingdom, and the Naval War College in 1993 in the United States.

Military career

Verma took charge of the Naval Academy in Goa, and subsequently became commander of a series of Indian Navy ships, including INS Ranvir (D54) and INS Viraat, India's only aircraft carrier. He then took over as the Flag Officer Commanding-in-Chief (FOC-in-C) of the Eastern Naval Command, and was appointed Chief of the Indian Navy upon the retirement of Sureesh Mehta on 31 August 2009. During his career he has been awarded several decorations, including the Param Vishisht Seva Medal and the Ati Vishisht Seva Medal.
He took over as the Chairman, Chief's of Staff Committee  on 30 July 2011 from the then outgoing Chief of Air Staff Air Chief Marshal P V Naik.

Awards

Post Retirement
Adm Verma was appointed as High Commissioner of India to Canada in 2012. He is currently a CNO Distinguished International Fellow at the US Naval War College.

References

|-

|-

|-

Chiefs of the Naval Staff (India)
Vice Chiefs of Naval Staff (India)
1951 births
Living people
High Commissioners of India to Canada
Naval War College alumni
Recipients of the Param Vishisht Seva Medal
Indian Navy admirals
Commandants of the Indian Naval Academy
Recipients of the Ati Vishisht Seva Medal
Academic staff of the National Defence College, India